Las Terrazas is a small community and nature reserve in the municipality of Candelaria, Artemisa Province, Cuba. It is located in the Sierra del Rosario mountains (part of Guaniguanico range), which was designated a Biosphere Reserve by UNESCO in 1984.

Overview
The village has a population of about 1,000 and a number of hotels and restaurants catering for tourists. The nature reserve includes 5000 ha of secondary forest which was planted on the surrounding (deforested) hills by building terraces to avoid erosion; hence the name (in Spanish, terrazas means terraces).

The reserve is rich in flora and fauna, and includes lakes, rivers, and waterfalls. Organised excursions on the many footpaths and trails can be booked at the local tourist office.

References

External links 

 Las Terrazas official site

Populated places in Artemisa Province
Nature reserves in Cuba
Tourist attractions in Artemisa Province